Brendan Venter (born 29 December 1969), is a South African general practitioner and rugby union coach and former player. Venter played at centre and earned 17 caps for South Africa between 1994 and 1999.

He played as a replacement in the 1995 Rugby World Cup final in which South Africa beat New Zealand to win their first World Cup.

Youth
Venter was born on 29 December 1969 in Johannesburg. He played rugby for South African schools. He said that even then his studies came first. "I was a good rugby player at school. I saw it as a tool to get a degree—my parents weren't very wealthy. I decided that if I made it as a rugby player it would be a bonus but that even if I didn't it would pay for my studies and I could become a doctor."

Venter went to the University of the Orange Free State to study medicine and play rugby. After too much partying in his first year, he just scraped through his exams. "I had a real reality check. I had to decide if I really wanted to be a rugby player or a doctor. So when I returned for my second year there was a complete change in attitude, and rugby took second place. I was determined to be a good doctor and felt that I had to give my studies priority in order to achieve this."

Playing career
Venter came on as replacement for James Small in the 1995 Rugby World Cup final. After the World Cup took place in 1995, rugby turned professional. However, Venter continued to practice as a doctor: "I was very lucky. Although we were professional, training in my province only started at five in the afternoon. So I had the whole day to work as a GP in my own practice as well as doing afternoons in anaesthetics. The rugby training was really my stress relief."

He was sent off in the 1999 Rugby World Cup for stamping against Uruguay in the pool stages, and was replaced by Pieter Muller for the rest of the tournament.

Test history 
 World Cup Final

Coaching career

London Irish 
In 2001 Venter moved to the United Kingdom with his wife and two children to coach and play for London Irish. "I was very analytical as a player and had always wanted to try out my ideas as a coach." Concurrently he continued to fit in GP locum work as well as dealing with his team's medical needs. He started in the 2002 Powergen Cup Final at Twickenham, as London Irish defeated the Northampton Saints.

He has said that medicine helps him be a better coach: "When I am faced with a coaching problem, I fall back on the principles I was taught as a doctor. I have learnt that sometimes it doesn't matter how much you know, how committed you are, how much work you put in. Sometimes there are variables that you can't predict. Medicine taught me to accept that there are some things I can't change."

Saracens 
He has admitted that when it comes to the crunch, he would always choose rugby over medicine, citing his newfound love of the game after joining Saracens as Director of Rugby in 2009.

On 13 May 2010 Venter was charged with misconduct by the RFU for allegedly pushing a Leicester Tigers supporter who had asked him to sit down as he was blocking the view of the paying fans as well as making inappropriate comments and gestures to spectators. In his defence, Venter described the incident as a bit of fun and the chief executive and the club owner of Saracens have defended Venter, claiming they considered it out of character for him. He had an existing four-week suspended ban from an incident earlier in the season, and eventually received a 10-week ban from rugby.

In November 2010 he was found guilty of misconduct due to being "inappropriately critical of ERC, the tournament, the match officials and the sport of rugby union" by ERC after he complained about the referee following his side losing at home in a key match when he considered them to be the better side, comments from neutral fans have expressed surprise at his opinions as his side were seen as out played and out thought by the opposing team. He was fined £21,850, but £13,100 was suspended until 30 June 2012.

In December 2010, Venter was warned by the ERC after giving a bizarre post-match interview following the Saracens defeat to Racing Métro 92 in the Heineken Cup. Venter gave extremely short answers to every question posed to him, and afterwards admitted that he was inspired from a comedy sketch from the film Mike Bassett: England Manager which he had recently watched. The interview has since become a hit on YouTube.

Venter left Saracens half way through the 2010-11 season and was replaced by Mark McCall. Saracens went on to win their first Premiership title at the end of that season and Venter was credited with setting the blueprint which facilitated this success.

Sharks 
A role he took in addition to his role at Saracens.

Return to London Irish 
On 1 July 2016, it was confirmed that Venter would return to London Irish as technical director in a new coaching setup. He was released from his role in March 2017 to be replaced by Declan Kidney.

Italy 
In January 2017 it was announced that Venter had been appointed defence coach of Italy until the end of the 2019 Rugby World Cup. He had work with the team in the previous year as a consultant.

South Africa 
In addition to his role with both Italy and London Irish, Venter took on the role of defence and exits coach for South Africa in spring 2017.

Italy confirmed that he would work with South Africa during the mid-year internationals and the Rugby Championship before returning to Italy for the autumn internationals.

See also
List of South Africa national rugby union players – Springbok no. 605

References

External links

1969 births
Living people
Afrikaner people
Alumni of Monument High School
South African people of Dutch descent
21st-century British medical doctors
London Irish players
South African rugby union coaches
South African rugby union players
South Africa international rugby union players
University of the Free State alumni
Western Province (rugby union) players
Stormers players
Rugby union players from Johannesburg
Rugby union centres
Rugby union wings